The Daruma pond frog (Pelophylax porosus) is a species of frog in the family Ranidae. It has two subspecies, P. porosus porosus (the Tokyo Daruma pond frog) and P. porosus brevipodus (the Nagoya Daruma pond frog). It is endemic to Japan. The average size of males is 3.5 to 6.2 cm, while females are from 3.7 to 7.3 cm.

Its natural habitats are temperate grassland, rivers, freshwater marshes, ponds, irrigated land, and canals and ditches. It is not considered threatened by the IUCN.

References

Endemic amphibians of Japan
Pelophylax
Amphibians described in 1868
Taxonomy articles created by Polbot